Henry Byrne (6 March 1920 – 6 April 1976) was an Irish Labour Party politician who served one term as a Teachta Dála (TD).

He first stood for election as an independent candidate at the 1944 general election for the Wicklow constituency, but was unsuccessful, receiving only 534 first-preference votes. He stood again as one of two Labour Party candidates at the 1961 general election for the Laois–Offaly constituency, but was unsuccessful.

He was successful on his next attempt, as the only Labour candidate at the 1965 general election in Laois–Offaly, taking his seat in the 18th Dáil.

Byrne did not contest the 1969 general election, and polled less than 1,000 first-preference votes when he stood again in the same constituency as one of two Labour candidates at the 1973 general election.

References

1920 births
1976 deaths
Labour Party (Ireland) TDs
Members of the 18th Dáil